The 1991 Tennessee Volunteers football team represented the University of Tennessee in the 1991 NCAA Division I-A football season. Playing as a member of the Southeastern Conference (SEC), the team was led by head coach Johnny Majors, in his 15th year, and played their home games at Neyland Stadium in Knoxville, Tennessee. They finished the season with a record of nine wins and three losses (9–3 overall, 5–2 in the SEC) and with a loss against Penn State in the Fiesta Bowl. The Volunteers offense scored 352 points while the defense allowed 263 points.

Schedule

Reference:

Roster

Rankings

Game summaries

UCLA

at Notre Dame

vs. Penn State (Fiesta Bowl)

Team players drafted into the NFL

Reference:

References

Tennessee
Tennessee Volunteers football seasons
Tennessee Volunteers football